Jarrod Poort (born 31 October 1994) is an Australian former competitive swimmer and two-time Olympian. Poort specialising in distance freestyle and open-water swimming competing at the international level from 2012 - 2017 on the Australian swim team.

Poort represented Australia in the 1500 metre freestyle at the 2012 Summer Olympics in London. He competed in the 2016 Summer Olympics in Rio de Janeiro, Brazil, in the 10-kilometre marathon swimming event. In the race he built a lead of 1 minute and 20 seconds, but was caught 1 km before the finish, and finished 21st. Poort trained out of Wollongong, NSW, representing West Illawarra Aquatic Swim Club.

Other than his Olympic pursuits Poort notably won both the 2017 Rottenest Channel Swim and the Port to Pub swims in Perth; two of Australia's longest and toughest swims. 2017 also witnessed him defend his Australian Champion 10 km title for the third year running; he then went on to narrowly take silver in the 2017 Australian Open Mens surf race at the Australian titles behind Ollie Signorini.

Poort is also part of the record holding Australian team (Tattersalls Masters Australia) whom hold the title as the fastest team across the Maui Channel. The swim starts at the pier on the island of Lanai and ends on the beach in front of the Kaanapali Beach Hotel on the island of Maui. Poort alongside Rhys Mainstone, Wallace Eggleton, George O'Brien, Ollie Signorini and Peter Thiel hold the record in 2.45.20 for the 9.9-mile crossing.

In April 2021, Poort announced his introduction to triathlon.

Competition record

References

1994 births
Living people
Australian male swimmers
Male long-distance swimmers
Olympic swimmers of Australia
Swimmers at the 2012 Summer Olympics
Swimmers at the 2016 Summer Olympics
20th-century Australian people
21st-century Australian people